The William Stone House is a historic house at the southeastern corner of the junction of Arkansas Highway 306 and Doris Lane in Colt, Arkansas.  It is a -story wood-frame structure, roughly in an L shape.  One leg of the L is on the right side, with a front-gable roof, extending south from the highway.  Set slightly back from the front of this section, the second leg of the L extends east, with a hip roof and a porch extending its width with six Tuscan columns for support.  The house is a fine local example of Plain Traditional architecture with Folk Victorian and Colonial Revival flourishes.

The house was listed on the National Register of Historic Places in 1992.

See also
National Register of Historic Places listings in St. Francis County, Arkansas

References

Houses on the National Register of Historic Places in Arkansas
Colonial Revival architecture in Arkansas
Houses in St. Francis County, Arkansas
National Register of Historic Places in St. Francis County, Arkansas
Folk Victorian architecture in the United States
Victorian architecture in Arkansas